The third season of the Canadian reality competition show Top Chef Canada was broadcast on Food Network in Canada. It is a Canadian spin-off of Bravo's hit show Top Chef.

Contestants
16 chefs competed in season three. Names, ages, hometowns, and cities of residence (at time of filming) are from the Food Network Canada website. In the order eliminated:

Eliminated:
Frederick "Fred" Boucher, 28, Price, QC (Hometown: Price, QC)
Ruth Eddolls, 30, Acton, ON (Hometown: Bristol, England)
Clement Chan, 33, Vancouver, BC (Hometown: Vancouver, BC)
Kayla Dhaliwall, 28, Victoria, BC (Hometown: Victoria, BC)
Daniel Hudson, 29, Coalville, UK (Hometown: Coalville, UK)
Chris Chafe, 24, St. John's, NL (Hometown: St. John's, NL)
Chris Shaften, 28, Calgary, AB (Hometown: Calgary, AB)
Rory White, 23, Mississauga, ON (Hometown: Mississauga, ON)
Rebecca "Becky" Ross, 24, Medicine Hat, AB (Hometown: Medicine Hat, AB)
Caitlin "Caity" Hall, 24, Maple Ridge, BC (Hometown: Maple Ridge, BC)
Geoff Rogers, 31, Calgary, AB (Hometown: Calgary, AB)
Nicole Gomes, 34, Richmond, BC (Hometown: Richmond, BC)
Dennis Tay, 34, Windsor, ON (Hometown: Windsor, ON) 
Jonathan Goodyear, 34, Toronto, ON (Hometown: Toronto, ON)
Danny "Smiles" Francis, 27, Montreal, QC (Hometown: Montreal, QC)
Matthew Stowe, 30, Cloverdale, BC (Hometown: Surrey, BC)

Contestant Progress

: Did not gain immunity.
: For winning immunity in the quickfire, Jonathan did not participate in the elimination challenge.
: Although in the bottom, Dan had won immunity in the quickfire challenge, so he was not eligible to be eliminated.
: Kayla had decided not to bring any of her team members with her to judges' table, thus automatically eliminating her.
: Only Kayla and Chris C, the team captains, were called to judges' table.  Chris C, the winning captain, was told by the judges that Becky had made the best dish and won the elimination challenge.
: Following the Quickfire, Dennis was permitted back into the competition.
: Starting from this quickfire, immunity is no longer available.
: As the captain of the losing team, Becky declared that she would withdraw from the competition, assuming that she would be eliminated anyway.
: The finale Quickfire was a High Stakes Quickfire with the losing chef being eliminated. No winner was announced for the Quickfire.
 (WINNER) The chef won the season and was crowned Top Chef.
 (RUNNER-UP) The chef was a runner-up for the season.
 (THIRD-PLACE) The chef placed third in the competition.
 (WIN) The chef won that episode's Elimination Challenge.
 (HIGH) The chef was selected as one of the top entries in the Elimination Challenge, but did not win.
 (LOW) The chef was selected as one of the bottom entries in the Elimination Challenge, but was not eliminated.
 (OUT) The chef lost that week's Elimination Challenge and was out of the competition.
 (IN) The chef neither won nor lost that week's Elimination Challenge. They also were not up to be eliminated.
 (WITHDRAW) The chef withdrew from the competition.

Episodes
The format of season three followed that of the first two seasons and of the original American Top Chef. As before, each week features a guest judge or special guest.

References

Canada, Season 3
2013 Canadian television seasons